Christian Bruno Leão da Rocha  known only as Chris Leão (born 20 April 1994) is a Brazilian reality television, DJ and musical producer. He became known in 2011 for winning the reality show Eye drops Capricho MTV Brasil. in 2013 he entered the world of music as a DJ with the song "On And On".

Biography and career

Chris Leão was expressively known when he took part and won the reality show Eye drops Capricho on MTV Brasil 2011, with over 2 million votes. After winning the reality, Chris became a teen phenomenon and made the cover of several Brazilian magazines, including Capricho Editora Abril. Chris Leão is also trained as an actor, already made appearances in series and sitcoms. Since child is passionate about music, in late 2014 became a professional DJ, becoming the great revelation at the scene, dragging crowds of fans and admirers in 2015 in all country. Chris Leão received the Brazilian DJ Favorite Award at the Brazilian Youth Award ( PJB), broadcast live on Multishow. His first music track (From Here To The World) has reached over 300,000 plays on the Internet and is already being played out in Brazil in big festivals. Chris Leão has worked in major festivals and music in their studio productions, with only 22 years has been outstanding and gaining respect in the electronic music scene. Chris Leão is a hit on social networks and accumulate millions of followers on the Internet.It is formed by the International Academy of Electronic Music (AIMEC). Chris helped Mathix (Matheus Soares) expand fans and performed together.

Indications and awards

Discography

Singles and albums
 "The Bad Touch - Single", Chris Leão & Allexis, 2017  
 "Why Can't You - Single", Chris Leão, 2017  
 "Taska Fuego - Single", Chris Leão & Geminix, 2017 
 "Black Pearl - Single", Chris Leão & Kary, 2016 
 "On and On - Single", Chris Leão & Ferrero, 2016
 "From Here to the World - Single", Chris Leão, 2015
 "System Shock - Single", Chris Leão & Bing Man, 2016
 "Pingdown - Single", Chris Leão & Thales, 2016
 "Burst - Single", Chris Leão & Davlis, 2016

Remixes
 "Why Can't You", Mathix Remix, 2017 
 "Claudia Leitte - Taquitá", Chris Leão & Geminix Remix, 2017 
 "Fifth Harmony - Boss", Remix Chris Leão, 2015
 "Demi Lovato - Cool For The Summer", Remix Chris Leão, 2015

Filmography

Television

References

1994 births
Living people
Brazilian people of Portuguese descent
Streamy Award winners
Brazilian Internet celebrities
Remixers
Electro house musicians
Brazilian DJs
Electronic dance music DJs